The 2001 Boise State Broncos football team represented Boise State University in the 2001 NCAA Division I-A football season. The Broncos competed in the Western Athletic Conference (WAC) and played their home games at Bronco Stadium in Boise, Idaho. The Broncos were led by first-year head coach Dan Hawkins.

The Broncos went 8–4 overall and 6–2 in WAC play, in a tie for second place. This was their first year in the WAC after leaving the Big West Conference, which dropped football. Despite finishing bowl eligible, Boise State was not invited to a bowl game.

The loss to Washington State of the Pac-10 on September 8 was BSU's last regular season loss at Bronco Stadium for over a decade. Two weeks later, they began a  regular season home winning streak that continued through October 2011 (BSU lost a bowl game at Bronco Stadium 

This was the first season that BSU and rival Idaho were not in the same conference since 1969, when the Broncos were an NAIA independent.  the introduction of the Governor's Trophy by UI alumnus Dirk Kempthorne to continue the series. The first game for the trophy was easily won by BSU and ironically played out of state, in Pullman, Washington. Idaho joined the WAC in 2005 and it returned to a conference game for six seasons. BSU joined the Mountain West Conference after the 2010 season; that was the most recent meeting and the Broncos hold a twelve-game winning streak over the Vandals, who last

Schedule

References

Boise State
Boise State Broncos football seasons
Boise State Broncos football